Vilmos Jakab (born 9 February 1952) is a Hungarian boxer. He competed in the men's light heavyweight event at the 1976 Summer Olympics.

References

External links
 

1952 births
Living people
Hungarian male boxers
Olympic boxers of Hungary
Boxers at the 1976 Summer Olympics
Sportspeople from Veszprém County
Light-heavyweight boxers
20th-century Hungarian people